Michael Meldrum (born January 14, 1968) is a Canadian former individual medley swimmer who represented Canada at the 1988 Summer Olympics in Seoul, South Korea.  There he finished in 23rd position in the 400-metre individual medley.

Michael Meldrum is currently the head coach of the Killarney Swim Club in Calgary, Alberta, and coaches the Senior A and Intermediate squads at the Repsol Sports Centre in Calgary. He lives with his wife Tania Meldrum and his daughters Mackenzie Meldrum and Morgan Meldrum in Calgary, Alberta. Mike has been with the Killarney Swim Club for 18 years where he has coaches many athletes to a professional level.

References
Canadian Olympic Committee

1968 births
Living people
Anglophone Quebec people
Canadian male freestyle swimmers
Canadian male medley swimmers
Olympic swimmers of Canada
Swimmers from Montreal
Swimmers at the 1987 Pan American Games
Swimmers at the 1988 Summer Olympics
Pan American Games silver medalists for Canada
Pan American Games bronze medalists for Canada
Pan American Games medalists in swimming
Medalists at the 1987 Pan American Games